Paul Ragusa (born May 24, 1971, in Bülach, Zürich) is retired male wrestler from Canada, who was born in Switzerland. He represented Canada at the 1996 Summer Olympics in Atlanta, Georgia, and twice won a medal at the Pan American Games during his career.

References
 sports-reference

External links
 

1971 births
Brock Badgers wrestlers
Commonwealth Games silver medallists for Canada
Pan American Games silver medalists for Canada
Living people
Olympic wrestlers of Canada
People from Bülach
Swiss emigrants to Canada
Wrestlers at the 1994 Commonwealth Games
Wrestlers at the 1996 Summer Olympics
Canadian male sport wrestlers
Wrestlers at the 1999 Pan American Games
Commonwealth Games medallists in wrestling
Pan American Games medalists in wrestling
Medalists at the 1999 Pan American Games
20th-century Canadian people
Medallists at the 1994 Commonwealth Games